The Eurotheum is a 31-storey,  skyscraper in the city center of Frankfurt, Germany. The building was constructed in 1999 to coincide with the adjacent Main Tower, and is one of a few such in Frankfurt that offers office and residential space. Each floor of the tower has  of office space, which was occupied mostly by the European Central Bank as an extension of their former headquarters at Eurotower, Willy-Brandt-Platz until 2015.

The 22nd floor has a public bar lounge. From the 22nd through 29th floors, there are 74 furnished apartments, which can be rented as long as desired. In addition, the "Innside Premium Suites" offer on demand hotel service.

The building was designed by Novotny Mähner Assoziierte.

See also 
 List of tallest buildings in Frankfurt
 List of tallest buildings in Germany

References

Buildings and structures completed in 1999
Skyscrapers in Frankfurt
Skyscraper office buildings in Germany
Residential skyscrapers
1999 establishments in Germany